Llapa District is one of thirteen districts of the province San Miguel in Peru.

See also 
 Wayra Punku

References